Hedychrum rutilans is a species of cuckoo wasps (insects in the family Chrysididae). The species occurs primarily in Austria, Italy, Bulgaria, Greece, France, Poland,  Portugal, Spain, Switzerland and in North Africa. The head and thorax are metallic green with red spots, while the abdomen is red. The color is more green and partially golden in the male and more extensively golden-red in the female. The body is somewhat hairy.

Biology
Hedychrum rutilans is a cleptoparasite and parasitoid of larvae of beewolves (Philanthus triangulum and Philanthus coronatus). The female cuckoo wasp lays its eggs on the  paralyzed honeybee workers serving as provisions for the beewolf larvae, placed by the female beewolf in its brood cells. The cuckoo wasp larvae feed on the honeybees and on the larvae of the beewolf. They prefer sandy and warm habitats.

Subspecies
Hedychrum rutilans var. rutilans  Dahlbom, 1854 
Hedychrum rutilans var. subparvulum  Linsenmaier, 196 
Hedychrum rutilans var. viridiauratum  Mocsáry, 1889 
Hedychrum rutilans var. viridiaureum  Tournier, 1877

References

External links

Chrysididae
Hymenoptera of Europe
Insects described in 1854
Taxa named by Anders Gustaf Dahlbom